Huitfeldtia is a monotypic genus of mites belonging to the family Pionidae. The only species is Huitfeldtia rectipes.

The species of this genus are found in Europe and Northern America.

References

Trombidiformes
Trombidiformes genera
Monotypic arachnid genera